Assam protected areas includes Seven national parks (2.51% of Assam's area), 17 wildlife sanctuaries (1.88% of Assam's area), and two proposed wildlife sanctuaries.

National parks

Wildlife sanctuaries 

Proposed Wildlife Sanctuaries
 North Karbi Anglong Wildlife Sanctuary
 Bordoibam Bilmukh Bird Wildlife Sanctuary 11.25

Biosphere reserve
 Manas
Dibru-Saikhowa

See also

List of protected areas of India

References

External links
 Official Statistical Handbook of Assam 2016-17

 
P
A